Chandokh is Gram Panchayat village in Mihona tehsil of Bhind district in the Indian state of Madhya Pradesh. It contains Chaklen, Chandokh and Kunwarpura No.1 villages.

Geography 

References

Villages in Bhind district